The Family History Library (FHL) is a genealogical research facility in downtown Salt Lake City. The library is open to the public free of charge and is operated by FamilySearch, the genealogical arm of the Church of Jesus Christ of Latter-day Saints (LDS Church).

History
The origins of the FHL can be traced to the founding of the Genealogical Society of Utah (GSU) in 1894. Through time the FHL has changed locations within Salt Lake City as follows:
 The GSU's first library was located in the office of the Church Historian, 58 E. South Temple Street 
 Church Administration Building, 47 E. South Temple Street (1917–1933)
 80 N. Main Street (1934–1962)
 100 S. Main Street (1962–1971)
 Church Office Building, 50 E. North Temple Street (1972–1985)
 35 N. West Temple Street (1985–Present)

The current building, just west of Temple Square was opened on October 23, 1985, and cost $8.2 million.

In 1938, the GSU began to microfilm records which contained genealogical data from around the world, and today this microfilm makes up much of the library's collection. Today the GSU is more commonly known as FamilySearch, and in September 2021, completed digitizing many of its microfilm collections to be shared online. In 2017, the FHL opened a new center for interactive discovery experiences.

1999 shooting
On April 15, 1999, 70-year-old Sergei Babarin entered the FHL's lobby and began shooting. A security officer and one female patron were killed while several others were injured. One hour and 45 minutes after the shooting began, Salt Lake police shot and fatally wounded Babarin in an exchange of gunfire. Babarin's family indicated he had a history of schizophrenia, a claim not corroborated by the Valley Community Mental Health Clinic. This occurred only four months after a separate shooting incident a block away at the Triad Center.

Purpose
Its main purpose is to fulfill one of the LDS Church fundamental tenets: that deceased family members, especially ancestors, can be baptized by proxy, as well as receive other saving ordinances. These ordinances are performed in temples.

Services
The FHL is located Salt Lake City, Utah. It is the largest genealogical library in the world. The library holds genealogical records for over 110 countries, territories, and possessions. Its collections include over 1.6 million rolls of microfilmed records onsite and access the total collection of more than 2.4 million rolls of microfilmed genealogical records; 727,000 microfiche; 356,000 books, serials, and other formats; 4,500 periodicals; 3,725 electronic resources including subscriptions to the major genealogical websites.

The FHL offers research assistance to help patrons trace their own family history. Professional genealogists and volunteers offer assistance in about 30 languages, which includes reading and translating genealogically relevant documents.  The FHL also offers free one-on-one consultations on difficult research problems. Additionally, there are classes on genealogical research topics free to the public and classes available online.

Branches

Branches of the FHL are called Family History Centers (FHC). While there are over 4,400 FHCs operating in more than 134 countries there are only about 17 major regional branch library class facilities. The others are ward, branch and stake facilities with at least one or more genealogical computers.

See also

 Family history
 Family History Research Wiki
 Genealogy
 Immigrant Ancestors Project
 List of Mormon family organizations

References

External links

 

Religious buildings and structures completed in 1985
Library buildings completed in 1985
Buildings and structures in Salt Lake City
Genealogy and the Church of Jesus Christ of Latter-day Saints
Libraries in Utah
Properties of the Church of Jesus Christ of Latter-day Saints
Genealogical libraries in the United States
The Church of Jesus Christ of Latter-day Saints in Utah
Latter Day Saint church buildings
1985 establishments in Utah

de:Genealogische Gesellschaft von Utah
es:Centro de Historia Familiar
pt:Centro de história da família